Veranópolis is a municipality in the state of Rio Grande do Sul, Brazil.  As of 2020, the estimated population was 26,533.

Veranópolis, like most of its neighbouring towns, is known as one of the cities with highest standards of living in Brazil. The city is also known for being home to one of the largest gun exporters in Brazil, E.R. Amantino, which produces several hunting rifles marketed in the United States by Stoeger Industries, and some models of combat shotguns for the Brazilian Army and São Paulo City Metropolitan Guard.

The city also is a big name in energy production, with the biggest Brazilian non-governmental biodiesel plant, Oleoplan S.A with an authorized capacity of 1.050.000 liters per day (277 380.655 US gallons per day) and a power plant that supplies 130MV (Monte Claro Plant) of hydroelectricity, due to the large river (Rio das Antas) and the landscape of highlands.

Veranópolis is also home of the Veranópolis Esporte Clube (VEC), a well known soccer team in the state's soccer league.

The town also hosts a small sports airclub which serves as a local airport for the region.

Commerce and trade

Veranópolis, like its neighbouring towns, is known for wine production hosting several wineries.

Industrial activity is also a major factor for the town, who hosts several sports goods industry such as Coopershoes (sports footgear), Dal Ponte (sports clothing) and E.R Amantino (sports guns). Also, outside the sports goods industry, there is Oleoplan S.A (biodiesel and soy products).

The town also has some small tourism revenue due to the wineries, nearby waterparks and its prime location in the Serra Gaúcha. Some enterprises were created to explore this, such as the Mirante da Serra, the first rotative tower restaurant in Brazil and the highest building in the region.

List of local wineries

 Vinícola Simonetto
 Vinícola Antônio Bin
 Vinícola da Paz
 Vinícola Barbarano
 Vinícola Mazzarollo
 Vinícola Farenzena
 Vinícola Affonso
 Union Distillery
 Vinícola Marson

Notable people
 Cássio Ramos Football player

See also
List of municipalities in Rio Grande do Sul

References

Municipalities in Rio Grande do Sul